The title holder of Miss Earth Norway will compete in the Miss Earth competition. Norway has competed 13 times in the Miss Earth pageant since that pageant's inception in 2000. This pageant is one of the 3 biggest pageants in the world, alongside Miss Universe and Miss World. Norway placed as semi finalists in the years 2003, 2004 and 2022. No Norwegian has won the Miss Earth title.

This year Lilly Sødal will be Miss Earth Norway, and will represented Norway in the competition this past fall.

History
In 2002 Miss Norway (previously called Frøken Norge) sent its first Miss Earth representative to Miss Earth 2002, the second edition of the Miss Earth beauty pageant. Its best result is Fay Larsen's Top 10 placement in 2003. Starting in 2010, the winner of Miss Norway would compete in the Miss Earth pageant. In 2012, the 1st Runner-up of Miss Norway competed at Miss Earth. 

Since 2013 and to present day, a chosen girl becomes "Miss Earth Norway", and the tittle is now given and not won. The representative is chosen carefully by the Miss Earth Norway Organization, and the latest titleholder. The chosen one will be crowned Miss Earth Norway and compete in the International compatition.

In 2022 the pageant was held in person first the first time after having been held virtually for the past 3 years during the pandemic. It was held for 3 weeks in the Philippines, where Norway had representative Lilly Sødal. She placed as part of Top 20 during the finales, making her the first Norwegian Semifinalist in Miss Earth after the country went unplaced for 18 years. This was also Norways first placement after 12 years in any International pageant.

Titleholders
Color key

References

External links
Froken Norge
Miss Earth 

 
Lists of Norwegian women
Recurring events established in 2002
Norway
Norwegian awards